Lemme Rossi (died 1673) was an Italian music theorist who was the first to publish a discussion of 31 equal temperament, the division of the octave into 31 equal parts, in his Sistema musico, ouero Musica speculativa doue SI spiegano i più celebri sistemi di tutti i tre generi of 1666. This slightly predates the publication of the same idea by the eminent scientist Christiaan Huyghens.

External links 
 Rossi discussed on a page concerning Huygens

Italian music theorists
Year of birth missing
1673 deaths